St Budeaux Foundation CofE (Aided) Junior School is a Academy religious junior school in the St Budeaux area of Plymouth, England, for pupils aged 7–11. The head teacher is Cathy Drage. There are 172 pupils.

History
Founded in 1717 as the Saint Budeaux Foundation School, it is the oldest school in the area. Indeed, the school's website considers it might be the oldest free school in Britain.  Originally for twelve children, in 1801 it was relocated to the Church Green poorhouse and in 1834 it became a national school, the Saint Budeaux National School, managed by the National Society for the Promotion of the Education of the Poor in the Principles of the Established Church. In 1903 the School became a "non-provided" School under the 1902 Education Act, then becoming named the Saint Budeaux Church of England Elementary School. Following the 1944 Education Act it became the Saint Budeaux Foundation Church of England Junior School. A new building was provided in 1981 because the previous building was needing to be demolished due to road building.

References

Further reading

External links
 School website

Educational institutions established in 1717
1717 establishments in England
Primary schools in Plymouth, Devon
Church of England primary schools in the Diocese of Exeter
Voluntary aided schools in England